Ahavat Olam (Eternal love) is the second prayer that is recited during Maariv. It is the parallel blessing to Ahava Rabbah that is recited during Shacharit, and likewise, is an expression to God for the gift of the Torah.

In the Ashkenazic rite, Ahava Rabbah is recited in the morning and Ahavat Olam is recited in the evening as a compromise. Sephardim recite Ahavat Olam at both Shacharit and Maariv. The debate over this recitation occurred between the Geonim. Saadia Gaon had made a ruling that followed that of his predecessor Amran. The last two Geonim, Sherira Gaon and Hai Gaon, made the final ruling which stands to this day.

Theme
The theme of Ahavat Olam is that God provides love in good times and in bad. Nighttime, when there is darkness, is a time associated with danger. Nevertheless, God provides protection at night, and the sun always rises in the morning.

Ahavat Olam is also seen as the blessing over the mitzvah of the recitation of the Shema.

References

Maariv
Hebrew words and phrases in Jewish prayers and blessings